The Glycoside-Pentoside-Hexuronide (GPH):Cation Symporter Family is part of the major facilitator superfamily and catalyzes uptake of sugars (mostly, but not exclusively, glycosides) in symport with a monovalent cation (H+ or Na+). The various members of the family have been reported to use Na+, H+ or Li, Na+ or Li+, or all three cations as the symported cation.

Structure 
Proteins of the GHP family are generally about 500 amino acids in length, although the Gram-positive bacterial lactose permeases are larger, due to a C-terminal hydrophilic domain that is involved in regulation by the phosphotransferase system. All of these proteins possess twelve putative transmembrane α-helical spanners.

Homology 
Homologues are from bacteria, including the distantly related sucrose:H+ symporters of plants and a yeast maltose/sucrose:H+ symporter of Schizosaccharomyces pombe. This yeast protein is about 24% identical to the plant sucrose:H+ symporters and is more distantly related to the bacterial members of the GPH family. Limited sequence similarity of some of these proteins with members of the major facilitator superfamily has been observed, and their 3D structures are clearly similar.

Transport Reaction 
The generalized transport reaction catalyzed by the GPH:cation symporter family is:
Sugar (out) + [H+ or Na+] (out) → Sugar (in) + [H+ or Na+] (in)

References 

Protein families
Membrane proteins
Transmembrane proteins
Transmembrane transporters
Transport proteins
Integral membrane proteins